The Eino Leino Prize is an annual prize award to top writers in Finland since 1956, with particular emphasis on poets.

It is named after Eino Leino, a pioneer of Finnish poetry.

Recipients

1956 Viljo Kajava
1957 Helvi Juvonen
1958 Rabbe Enckell
1959 Aapeli (Simo Puupponen)
1960 Olavi Paavolainen
1961 Juha Mannerkorpi
1962 Pertti Nieminen
1963 Paavo Haavikko
1964 Arvo Salo
1965 Hagar Olsson
1966 Einari Vuorela
1967 Marja-Leena Mikkola
1968 Kerttu Kauniskangas
1969 Mirjam Polkunen
1970 Heikki Palmu
1971 Vilhelm Helander and  Mikael Sundman
1972 Raoul Palmgren
1973 Arvo Turtiainen
1974 Kaisa Korhonen
1975 Henrik Tikkanen
1976 Eila Kivikk'aho
1977 Nils-Börje Stormbom
1978 Jukka Vieno
1979 Mirkka Rekola
1980 Elvi Sinervo
1981 Väinö Kirstinä
1982 Hannu Mäkelä
1983 Pentti Linkola
1984 Erno Paasilinna
1985 Hannu Salama
1986 Claes Andersson
1987 Helvi Hämäläinen
1988 Jyrki Pellinen
1989 Tuomas Anhava
1990 Olli Jalonen
1991 Ilpo Tiihonen
1992 Jaan Kaplinski
1993 Jyrki Kiiskinen and  Jukka Koskelainen
1994 Risto Ahti
1995 Caj Westerberg
1996 Risto Rasa
1997 Thomas Warburton
1998 Raija Siekkinen
1999 Kai Nieminen
2000 Sirkka Turkka
2001 Markku Into
2002 Virpi Hämeen-Anttila and Jaakko Hämeen-Anttila
2003 Tuomari Nurmio
2004 Veijo Meri
2005 Antti Hyry
2006 Juha Hurme
2007 Eira Stenberg
2008 
2009 Hannele Huovi
2010 J. K. Ihalainen
2011 Kari Aronpuro
2012 
2013 Leif Salmén
2014 
2015 Leevi Lehto
2016 Liisa Enwald
2017 Leena Krohn
2018 Kirsi Kunnas
2019 Jaana Koistinen
2020 Johanna Venho
2021 Miia Toivio
2022 Kaiho Nieminen

References

Finnish literary awards
Awards established in 1956
1956 establishments in Finland